The ancient parishes of Cheshire refers to the group of parishes that existed in the English county of Cheshire, roughly within the period of 1200–1800. Initially, the ancient parishes had only an ecclesiastical function, but reforms initiated by King Henry VIII, developed by Queen Elizabeth I and expanded by later legislation led them to acquire various secular functions that eventually led to a split between the ecclesiastical parishes and the purely civil parishes that exist today.

Ancient parish overall details
The data are in the form of two tables: the first one gives information about each ancient parish whilst the second one gives information about each chapelry that may exist within each ancient parish. This complexity is brought about by having ancient parishes which, after the dissolution of the monasteries in the sixteenth century, possessed in some form or another both an ecclesiastical role and a civil role. This dual role existed until the nineteenth century.

Ancient parishes

Chapelry details

Extra-parochial areas

Various areas of Cheshire were not included in any ancient parish. As Dunn states: The reasons are various and occasionally obscure. Dunn later goes on to state that associations with religious houses (priories, abbeys and so on) or with the Crown seem to explain most of them, but this area of research is still ongoing. The following table contains the extra-parochial places or areas of Cheshire with some details about each of them:

Notes and references

Notes

Bibliography

History of Cheshire
Cheshire